Huarancante (possibly from Aymara) is a mountain in the Andes of Peru, about  high. It is situated in the Arequipa Region, Caylloma Province, on the border of the districts Callalli, Chivay and Yanque, southeast of Chivay. Huarancante lies southwest of the mountain Jello Jello.

References 

Mountains of Peru
Mountains of Arequipa Region